Li Tsung-chueh (born April 13, 1980) is a Taiwanese former swimmer, who specialized in breaststroke events. Li competed only in the men's 200 m breaststroke at the 2000 Summer Olympics in Sydney. He achieved a FINA B-standard of 2:19.10 from the National University Games in Taipei. He challenged seven other swimmers in heat three, including Costa Rica's two-time Olympian Juan José Madrigal. He raced to a second seed in 2:19.30, trailing South Korea's Joe Kyong-Fan, winner of his heat, by 11-hundredths of a second. Li failed to advance into the semifinals, as he placed thirtieth overall in the prelims.

References

1980 births
Living people
Taiwanese male swimmers
Olympic swimmers of Taiwan
Swimmers at the 2000 Summer Olympics
Taiwanese male breaststroke swimmers
Sportspeople from Taipei
Swimmers at the 1998 Asian Games
Asian Games competitors for Chinese Taipei